Dixon Hall Lewis (August 10, 1802 – October 25, 1848) was an American politician who served as a Representative and a Senator from Alabama.

Life and career
Lewis was born on Bothwick plantation, Dinwiddie County, Virginia, and moved to Hancock County, Georgia, with his parents in 1806. He graduated from Mount Zion Academy and from South Carolina College at Columbia in 1820. He moved to Autauga County, Alabama, the same year, where he studied law and was admitted to the bar in 1823. That same year he constructed a house ("Old Homestead") in the town of Lowndesboro, Alabama, twenty miles west of the state capitol in Montgomery. He began to practice law in Montgomery and was elected a member of the Alabama House of Representatives in 1826, serving until 1828. He was elected as a States Rights Democrat to the twenty-first and to the seven succeeding Congresses and served from March 4, 1829, to April 22, 1844, when he resigned the House to join the Senate. He served as chairman of the United States House Committee on Indian Affairs from 1831 to 1835. He was nearly elected Speaker of the House in the 26th Congress, receiving 113 votes on the 8th ballot, just four votes short of the necessary 117 needed to be elected. Robert M. T. Hunter was elected on the 11th ballot.

In 1844 Lewis was appointed by his brother-in-law Governor Benjamin Fitzpatrick to the United States Senate to fill the vacancy caused by the resignation of William R. King in 1844. He was reelected as the Democratic candidate in 1847 and served from April 22, 1844, until his death in New York City on October 25, 1848. In the Senate he served as chairman of the Finance Committee from 1845 to 1847.

A strikingly obese figure, Lewis was known to weigh as much as 500 pounds (227 kg), making him the heaviest member of Congress ever. A specially-constructed seat was provided in the Senate chambers for him, and his carriage was fitted with unusually heavy suspension springs. According to the WPA Federal Writers' Project publication Alabama: A Guide to the Deep South, a popular witticism among Lewis's colleagues was the observation that Alabama had the largest representation of any state.

Lewis is interred at Green-Wood Cemetery in Brooklyn, New York.

See also
List of United States Congress members who died in office (1790–1899)

References

Alabama State Planning Commission. (1941) Alabama: A Guide to the Deep South. American Guide Series. Compiled by Workers of the Writer's Project of the Works Projects Administration in the State of Alabama.

External links
 Green-Wood Cemetery Burial Search

1802 births
1848 deaths
People from Dinwiddie County, Virginia
American people of Welsh descent
Jacksonian members of the United States House of Representatives from Alabama
Nullifier Party members of the United States House of Representatives from Alabama
Democratic Party members of the United States House of Representatives from Alabama
Deans of the United States House of Representatives
Democratic Party United States senators from Alabama
Democratic Party members of the Alabama House of Representatives
People from Autauga County, Alabama
People from Hancock County, Georgia
People from Lowndes County, Alabama
Alabama lawyers
19th-century American lawyers
University of South Carolina alumni
Burials at Green-Wood Cemetery